Roy Payne may refer to:
 Roy Payne (footballer), Australian rules footballer
Roy S. Payne,  federal U.S. magistrate judge
Roy Payne (racing driver), American stock car racing driver